Karuvelam Pookkal is a 2000 Indian Tamil-language film, directed by Poomani. It was jointly produced by National Film Development Corporation of India, and Doordarshan. It stars Nasser, Raadhika, Thalaivasal Vijay and Charle among others. The film's Music is composed by Ilaiyaraaja.

Plot
It is a graphic picture of the abject misery of the rural poor. Its hard hitting message screams at you from the screen, loud and clear. Hitherto, there seemed to be only a couple of angles to Child labour in India, viz., children losing out on their carefree childhood and basic formal education. But there are so many other unthought of issues too, says scriptwriter and director Poomani, through the film Karuvelam Pookkal, jointly produced by NFDC and Doordarshan.

Karisalkulam, a small village, is inhabited mainly by Farmers. When the arid land offers them nothing but penury, enter the match factory owners from nearby villages. They lure the credulous, illiterate villagers into sending their daughters to work at the factories from dawn to much after dusk. The initial euphoria of a steady income givesway to despair, as is clearly brought out through the story of Nallamuthu (Nasser), his wife Vadivu (Raadhika) and their three children. Mariyappan (Charle) is the Match factory agent in charge of finding child labourers for the factory. While the children slog in the factories the men of the household become lazy appendages who spend their time getting drunk. Nasser, as the cynical father, who does not wish to get his daughter married because he does not want to forgo the income, has rendered a splendid performance in Karuvelam Pookal. Mention must be made of the scenes in which he cries aloud at his tragedies and when his impotent anger is turned towards the agents of the match factories. Radhika's is another sterling portrayal. In the role of a responsible mother caught between her husband's apathy and avarice and her children's untold suffering, she indeed lives the character. Sonia is the eldest daughter, Dhanalakshmi. Caught in the quagmire of drudgery and in the strangulating web of poverty, she seeks a way out, but sadly the respite is too short lived. A convincing essay by the young Actress. The visuals of the opening sequences transport you to the days of Bharatiraja's movie 16 Vayadhinilae. The beautifully captured rustic ambience is another creditable show by Thangar Bachan who has wielded the camera. The dialect, the innocent humour, the openness and the gullibility – Poomani presents them all with absolute vividness.
The factories need only young girls and the boys therefore escape the hardship. After stressing on this point throughout, it is strange to see the boy accompany his sister to work, in the end. The fragrance of Karuvelam Pookkal is bound to last in the minds of the discerning audience. A film that makes you think.

Cast
 Nasser as Nallamuthu.
 Raadhika as Vadivu.
 Charle as Mariappan.
 Thalaivasal Vijay as Teacher.
 Shakthi as Thangavelu.
 Soniya as Dhanalakshmi.

Soundtrack
The music composed by Ilaiyaraaja. The lyrics for the song Kaalayila Kann Muzhichaen (Translation: In the morning, I woke up) are particularly touching and the soulful melody adds to the effect. Ilaiyaraja's music in a bucolic setting is an exotic combination, as Karuvelam Pookkal clearly proves.

Awards
 Tamil Nadu State Film Award Special Prize in 1996

International Film festivals 
The movie was screened in the following international film festivals:

 Zanzibar International Film Festival in 1998.

References

External links
 Zanzibar International Film Festival brochure (via Google books)
 Karuvelam Pookkal movie cover photo

2000 films
Films scored by Ilaiyaraaja
2000s Tamil-language films